The digastric branch of facial nerve arises close to the stylomastoid foramen, and divides into several filaments, which supply the posterior belly of the Digastricus; one of these filaments joins the glossopharyngeal nerve.

References

External links
 
 
 http://www.dartmouth.edu/~humananatomy/figures/chapter_47/47-5.HTM 

Facial nerve